The Boston University Terriers represented Boston University in the Women's Hockey East Association during the 2014–15 season. The #5 Terriers won the WHEA Tournament by upsetting #1 Boston College.  They earned a berth in the NCAA Tournament, where they lost to Wisconsin in the quarterfinal round.

Offseason
 August 5: Three current members of the Terriers roster were invited to the Canadian U22 camp. Shannon Doyle, Sarah Lefort and Samantha Sutherland were joined by incoming freshmen Victoria Bach and Rebecca Leslie. 2014 graduate Louise Warren was also in attendance. Maddie Elia was invited to the USA Hockey Women’s National Festival in Lake Placid, New York. Both camps were used to determine rosters for a three-game series involving the Canadian and US Under-22 teams from August 21–24 in Calgary, Alberta. Of note, Terriers assistant coach Katie Lachapelle was also at the Festival. She was to serve as an assistant coach on the US Under-18 Team.

Recruiting

Roster

2014-15 Terriers

Schedule

|-
!colspan=12 style=""| Regular Season

|-
!colspan=12 style=""| WHEA Tournament

|-
!colspan=12 style=""| NCAA Tournament

Awards and honors
 Boston University won its fourth consecutive WHEA championship, and fifth championship overall 
 Marie-Philip Poulin was a finalist for the Patty Kazmaier Award, named captain of Team Canada for World Championships.
 Victoria Bach was named WHEA Rookie of the Year
 Victoria Bach, Hockey East Rookie of the Month (February 2015) 
 Rebecca Leslie, Hockey East Rookie of the Month (October 2014) 
 Erin O'Neill, Hockey East Rookie of the Week (Week of December 15, 2014) 
 Marie-Philip Poulin, Hockey East Player of the Month (January 2015) 
 Marie-Philip Poulin, Hockey East Player of the Month (February 2015)

References

Boston University
Boston University Terriers women's ice hockey seasons